JDS Kuroshio (SS-570) was the fifth boat of thes. She was commissioned on 27 November 1974.

Construction and career
Kuroshio was laid down at Kawasaki Heavy Industries Kobe Shipyard on 5 July 1972 and launched on 22 February 1974. She was commissioned on 27 November 1974, into the 2nd Submarine Group.

Participated in Hawaii dispatch training from July 12 to October 6, 1978 .

Participated in Hawaii dispatch training from September 23 to December 23, 1982 .

21 March 1989, the 1st Diving Corps group is incorporated into the 5th Diving Corps and transferred to Kure.

On 20 March 1991, she was reclassified to a special service submarine, the ship registration number was changed to ATSS-8003, and she became a ship under the direct control of the 1st Submarine Group.

She was decommissioned on 1 March 1994.

Citations

1974 ships
Uzushio-class submarines
Ships built by Kawasaki Heavy Industries